{{Infobox animanga/Print
| type            = manga
| author          = Ai
| publisher       = Comic Smart (webcomic)Earth Star Entertainment (print)
| publisher_en    = 
| demographic     = Shōnen
| magazine        = Ganma (webcomic)Comic Earth Star (print)
| imprint         = Earth Star Comics
| first           = December 11, 2013
| last            = 
| volumes         = 2
| volume_list     = 
}}

 is a Japanese web manga written and illustrated by Ai. It began serialization on Comic Smart's free manga website Ganma in December 2013 and has since been collected into two tankōbon volumes. An anime television series adaptation by Asahi Production aired from July to September 2015.

Plot
Sūko is an idol-loving shut-in who uses the power of the internet to make relatively unknown idols popular. Ryū-san, on the other hand, is a passionate idol otaku who always attends performances by whoever his favorite artist of the moment is. Sūko uses her prowess to popularise the local idol group, Itorio, while Ryū-san focuses his support on the underground idol, Mariko. The competitiveness of these two otakus to promote their respective idols to stardom changes their careers forever.

Characters
Idol fanatics

The main protagonist. An idol-loving hikikomori (shut-in) who has the ability to make any idol popular through the power of blogging. Having visited one of Itorio's live performances, she decides to use her blog to give them a boost in popularity.

A wota who constantly attends live performances of his favorite idols.

Idols

An underground idol who lives with her single mother. Spurred on by Ryū-san and the rest of her fans, Mariko is extremity talented and sets her sights on stardom, but struggles with obtaining popularity in comparison to Itorio.

A group of local idols from the Fukuoka Prefecture, who rise to stardom thanks to Sūko's blog.

She is the reason why Sūko and Ryū-san became idol fan. Became famous thanks to their support and ranked No. 1 right after her major debut.

An idol from the same agency as Mariko.

Others

Sūko's younger sister, who often worries about her hikkikomori behavior.

The manager of CSM Records.

Media
MangaMillion Doll began as a web manga written and illustrated by Ai. It was first serialized on Comic Smart's free manga website Ganma with its first chapter being published in December 2013. Comic Earth Star published the first two tankōbon volumes on June 26, 2015.

Anime
An anime adaptation produced by Asahi Production was announced in the March 2015 issue of Newtype magazine. The adaptation is directed by Keiichiro Kawaguchi (episode 1) and Tomio Yamauchi (episodes 6 through 12) and written by Momoko Murakami, with a series premiere on July 6, 2015.

Episode list

References

External links
Million Doll at Ganma'' 
Million Doll official anime website 

2010s webcomics
2013 manga
2015 anime television series debuts
2015 Japanese television series endings
Anime series based on manga
Asahi Production
Japanese idols in anime and manga
Japanese webcomics
Shōnen manga
Television shows based on Japanese webcomics
Tokyo MX original programming
Earth Star Entertainment manga
2013 webcomic debuts